The 2002–03 National Soccer League season, was the 27th season of the National Soccer League in Australia.  The finals format was revised for this season, with the top six teams at the end of the regular season qualifying for a home-and-away championship series.  The top two teams from the championship series progressed to the grand final.  Olympic Sharks were crowned premiers and Perth Glory were champions.

Teams

Regular season

League table

Championship play-offs

Grand final

References 

OzFootball Archives - 2002–03 NSL Season

National Soccer League (Australia) seasons
1
1
Aus
Aus